Rasen-Antholz is a municipality in South Tyrol in northern Italy.

Geography

The municipal area stretches along the Antholz valley, a northern side valley of the larger Puster Valley. In the northeast, the Staller Saddle mountain pass, at a height of  leads into the Defereggen Valley in East Tyrol, Austria. The Antholz valley is confined by the mountains of the Rieserferner Group in the north and the Villgraten Mountains in the east, both part of the High Tauern range in the Central Eastern Alps. Large parts of the northern and western mountain ranges belong to the Rieserferner-Ahrn Nature Park established in 1988. The Antholzer Bach stream runs through the valley from Antholzer See (Lago di Anterselva) down to its confluence with the Rienz (Rienza) river at Olang.

It borders the following municipalities: Bruneck, Gsies, Percha, Olang, Sand in Taufers, Welsberg-Taisten and Sankt Jakob in Defereggen in Austria.

Frazioni
The municipality of Rasen-Antholz contains six frazioni (subdivisions, mainly villages and hamlets): Antholz Niedertal (Anterselva di Sotto), Antholz Mittertal (Anterselva di Mezzo), Antholz Obertal (Anterselva di Sopra), Neunhäusern (Nove Case), Niederrasen (Rasun di Sotto) and Oberrasen (Rasun di Sopra).

Linguistic distribution
According to the 2011 census, 98.40% of the population speak German, 1.16% Italian and 0.44% Ladin as first language.

History

Archaeological findings of a Hallstatt cemetery near Niederrasen denote a settlement of the area already in the Iron Age. In 15 BC, present-day Tyrol was conquered by the Roman Empire. About 590 AD, Bavarian tribes under their Duke Tassilo I entered the region.

Rasen itself was first mentioned in a 1050 deed, the local Lords of Rasen served as ministeriales of the Counts of Tyrol from the 13th century onwards. They resided at Altrasen Castle which was first documented in 1210. Count Meinhard II of Tyrol ceded it to his consort Elisabeth of Bavaria in 1259. Meanwhile, the Lords of Rasen had Neurasen Castle erected, which fell to the Bishops of Brixen in 1342.

Upon the extinction of the Meinhardiner counts in 1500, Tyrol as a whole became a crown land of the Habsburg monarchy.

Coat-of-arms
The shield is gules a pile reversed on sable and argent. It is the sign of the Lords of Rasen, who ruled from 1353. The emblem was officially adopted on 10 August 1967.

Sports

Rasen-Antholz is known for the South Tyrol Arena biathlon track, which opened in 1971. It hosted the Biathlon World Championships in 1975, 1976, 1983, 1995, 2007 and 2020. It will host biathlon for the 2026 Winter Olympics in Milan and Cortina d'Ampezzo.

Antholz also hosted the finish of stage 17 of the 2019 Giro d'Italia, which was won by Nans Peters.

Notable people
Hubert Leitgeb (1965–2012), biathlete
Wilfried Pallhuber (born 1967), biathlete
Johann Passler (born 1961), biathlete
Gottlieb Taschler (born 1962), biathlete
Dorothea Wierer (born 1990), biathlete
Dominik Windisch (born 1989), biathlete
Andreas Zingerle (born 1961), biathlete

References

External links

Official website 

Municipalities of South Tyrol
Ski areas and resorts in Italy